Andrés Bucci is a Chilean electronic music producer and DJ. He is known for his solo work as well as for his role as a member of Plan V. He is one of three Bucci brothers (Juan Pablo, Pier and Andrés), all DJs and electronic music producers.

Andrés Bucci began his career in 1996 while living in Germany, and the influence of the Berlin scene is noticeable in his work. He is a member of the group Plan V where he works with Gustavo Cerati (Soda Stereo), Christian Powditch and Guillermo Ugarte,  has also worked with Kate Simko in project called "Detalles"., and with his brother Pier Bucci in a duo called Bucci.

Career
Andrés Bucci was born in Santiago, Chile and grew up in the "Bucci Gallery" in the city centre. One of the few places that offered art exhibition space in the Chilean military regime, the Bucci Gallery was one of the cultural bastions of the last years of the dictatorship and welcomed emerging avant-garde painters as well as punk and 80s new wave musicians.
In 1996, while living in Germany, Andrés met Jimi Tenor at the Kunsthaus Tacheles, an important art center where he rented a studio. They worked on some tracks together and Bucci realized he was able to produce music suitable for release.
On a trip to his homeland of Chile, Andrés contacted his friend Christian Powditch and with him, along with Guillermo Ugarte and the Argentinean Gustavo Cerati (lead musician and voice of Soda Stereo), created in 1995 his first musical project, Plan V. The first album of the group "Plan V" (1995) was a success and introduced Chilean electronic music to major audiences, with their second album in 1998 bringing them popularity on both sides of the Andes. Alongside this, Andrés produced solo work under the pseudonym of Chord, performing in Chile and Argentina at venues such as Club La Feria, La Casa Club and Microman.
In 1999, the label Ruta 5 (owned by Martin Schopf's Berlin based Chilean musician, aka Dandy Jack), invited Andrés to participate in the "Austral project", a compilation album of Chilean artists such as Atom Heart, Ricardo Villalobos, Luciano and Daniel Nieto (Danieto), released on Payola record label.
In 2000, Andrés was invited to curate a Chilean art exhibition in Berlin's Bethanien Art Center. He integrated the exhibition with music, performing himself and sharing the stage with German musicians Stereo Total and Silvesterboy (Golden Citronen).
During 2001, Andrés released his debut album under the pseudonym Chord, titled "Monochord". He also released many remixes for important South American artists such as Original Hamster, Chilean musicians Pánico, Bitman & Roban, and the Argentinian Gustavo Cerati, and continued performing live in Chile and Argentina.
In 2002, he formed the duo "Detalles" with Kate Simko, a music student from Chicago, and released the album "Shapes of summer" for the German label Traum. They would later, in 2007, release "Micros morning" for the US label Kupei Musika.
In 2003, Andrés performed as Chord at the MicroMutek festival in Valparaiso and in the same year, released an EP with his brother Pier for the WMF record label.
The duo, known as "Bucci", debuted with their track "Dude" and came in at number 8 in the specialized De:Bug magazine chart, performing in several Berlin clubs. Also in 2003, Bucci appeared in the "Canción Electrónica" (Electronica Song) compilation album from Argentina's Indice Virgen Records and the "Colores Compilation" album from Mexico's Mil Records.

In 2004, Andrés performed with Detalles at the Mutek Festival in Chile where they were named one of the "next 100 most influential bands of the year" in the US by URB (magazine) URB magazine.
In 2005, Bucci was invited to perform at Mutek Festival in Canada where his set received excellent reviews. From this point Bucci started to perform frequently in clubs around Europe.

In 2007, Andrés released his solo EP "Chocopanda", and performed with Bucci at the Raum Club in Barcelona, at the Synch Festival in Greece and at Watergate Club in Berlin. With Detalles, he performed at Mutek Festival in Canada and later at the Worldtronics Festival in Der Hause der Kulturen der Welt in Berlin, alongside other international artists.
The same year he performed at Panorama Bar Berlin and Watergate Club to promote the EP "Andrés Bucci-Avec Style", released by Horizontal label owned by another Chilean producer Dinky.
In 2008, he performed at Watergate Club and the Weekend Club in Berlin, at Unit Club in Tokyo and at T-Bar in London.

Discography
As Andres Bucci
Need More Casio Ep-Hummingbird Label-2013
Jackin' Jungle Maruca Music-2013
Mental Menthology - Hummingbird - 2012
Unity Hood EP (12") – Hummingbird, 2011
Avec Style EP (12") – Horizontal, 2008
Chocopanda EP (12") – Kupei Musika, 2007
Don Julio's Converseria EP (12") – Cynosure, 2005
Badminton EP (12") – Cynosure, 2004
Skip & Chord (12") – WMF Records 2003

Remixes
Leonino / Jorge Gonzalez-We Should Be Friends  Andres Bucci Remix - Hueso Records-2015
Föllakzoid "Pulsar"  Andres Bucci Rework - Sacred Bones Records -2014
Miss Garrison  Montana Andres Bucci Remix -2014
Makers Of Sense,  To The Warehouse Andres Bucci Remix -2012
Antiguo Automata Mexicano "Surspacea Andres Bucci  Xberg Noon Remix Static Dicsos-2011 
Edgar Jack&Lauren Chabon "She Was Underaged Dancer"- Andres Bucci Remix- Hummingbird Label -2010
Tremolo Audio (CD), Transito (Beamer Mix By Andres Bucci) – Mil Records, 2008
Derelikt (MP3, EP), Cunnilingus (Andres Bucci Remix) – 808, 2008
Flavius E – Indicios (12", Ltd, EP), Ocres (Andres Bucci Remix) – Kupei Musika, 2007
Gustavo Cerati – Reversiones / Siempre Es Hoy (2xCD), No Te Creo

As Chord

Albums 
Monochord (2001 – Background)

Singles, EPs and others
Acid Drop-Doubting Thomas Remix - Hummingbird -2013
Steps Ahead  Edgar Jack Up Late In Kreuzber remix - Hummingbird Label-2012
Stimulation Edgar Jack Remix - Hummingbird Label -2012
Tickling Whispers Doubting Thomas Remix - Hummingbird-2012
Floating -Various Focal Point Vol 4 Cynosure Records - 2012
Soul Thing Alexi Delano Remix -Hummingbird Label - 2011
Impar 10 Compilation (30xFile, MP3, 224), Bloom – Impar, 2009
Analyze This 100% Vinyl (CDr, Mixed, Comp), In Berlin 1995 (U.Schmidt Edit) – Sony Norge, 2009
Dinky Mixes Horizontal (CD, Comp, Mixes) – P Vine Records, Horizontal, 2008
Micros Morning (CD, Album) – Kupei Musika - 2007
Don Julio's converseria EP  Cynosure Records - (2005)
Condormusic Compilation - (2004)
Re:Bird The Electronicat Remixes (CD) Electrico – Angelika Köhlermann, 2004
Colores Volumen 1 (CD) Rare – Mil Records, 2004
Moment (CD) Dude – WMF Records, 2004
Bucci EP (2003)
Canción electrónica - Indice Virgen Label  (2003)
Skip & Chord (12") Rek – WMF Records, 2003
Antenna International (12") Rhodes Relejades – Antenna International, 2003
Fueradeserie!_compilado 01 (CDr) Slom, Koe – Fueradeserie! 2002

As Detalles

Albums
Shapes of summer (2003)
Micros morning (CD, Album) – Kupei Musika, 2007

Singles, EPs and others
Hello Donee EP (12", EP) – Kupei Musika, 2006
Tour de Traum (CD, 12") -"Rhodes Relejadas" – Traum Schallplatten, 2004
Hazardous materials (CD) Solm – The Consumers Research & Development Label, 2005

References

External links
Andres Bucci in Resident Advisor

1975 births
Living people
Chilean musicians
German techno musicians
People from Santiago